Lake Bloomington is located near Hudson, Illinois, United States. Lake Bloomington is a man-made lake, the original purpose of constructing the lake was to supply Bloomington-Normal with a reliable, primary source of water. Lake Bloomington is fed by Money Creek, whose water source is mostly field runoff from around the Towanda area. There was a need for this water supply, extensive research and construction resulted in the project costing more than the expected amount. The maximum horsepower of motor boats is 40 HP, with a maximum speed of 25 MHP. Crappie fishing is very good with most fish under 10". 
Fish Limits:

 FISH SIZE	                      CREEL LIMITS
 Large and Smallmouth Bass	 Minimum 15” 3 per day
 Walleye	                         Minimum 18” 3 per day
 Northern Pike	                 Minimum 24” 3 per day
 Hybrid Striped Bass	         10 fish daily harvest limit with no more than 3 fish greater than or equal to 17"
 White, Black or Hybrid Crappie	 No Minimum Length 15 per day
 Bluegill or Redear Sunfish	 No Minimum Length 25 per day

History
The first meeting to talk about making this water source was held in the 1920s. The meeting included about 10 members. It was held at Bloomington City Hall. Egbort Hawk took control of the commission to create Lake Bloomington. The council decided to put out a survey to the people asking who would use the lake for recreational purposes such as swimming, fishing, family activities etc. About 8,500 people responded to the survey saying they would benefit from the lake. 
L. E. Baker owned the land, and sold it to the City Council so the lake could be built. He sold the land per acre at a price of $185 and over 1,200 acres were purchased by the council. 
The city had to controversially cut down over 50,000 trees to build the lake. Some records suggest they cut down more than what the City Council told the public. The workers used bonfires to clear the dried brush, but the logs were taken out by train. 
About twenty different species of fish were transported to Lake Bloomington after construction. Some of the fish species were endangered and were transported to the lake in hope of increasing the population.   
Lake Bloomington was finished in April 1930. By fall, the full opening of the lake was celebrated along with the 100th birthday of McLean County. The official formal dedication was on August 31, 1930. Slightly less than 30% of the visitors were not from Bloomington.

References

External links

Bloomington
Bodies of water of McLean County, Illinois